Makaising is a village development committee in Gorkha District in the Gandaki Zone of northern-central Nepal. At the time of the 1991 Nepal census it had a population of 2,231 and had 416 houses in the village.

The village is connected by an unpaved road with Prithvi Highway.

It has a primary health center.

References

Populated places in Gorkha District